Changing Our Minds: The Story of Dr. Evelyn Hooker is a 1992 American documentary film directed by Richard Schmiechen. The film, which chronicles the work of Evelyn Hooker, a psychologist who challenged the then-standard psychological view of homosexuality, was nominated for an Academy Award for Best Documentary Feature.

See also
 Conversion therapy

References

External links
Changing Our Minds: The Story of Dr. Evelyn Hooker at Frameline

1992 films
1992 documentary films
1992 LGBT-related films
American documentary films
American black-and-white films
American LGBT-related films
Sexual orientation change efforts
Documentary films about LGBT topics
Documentary films about psychology
Films about conversion therapy
Sexual orientation and psychology
1990s English-language films
1990s American films